Leo C. Zeferetti (July 15, 1927 – March 21, 2018) was a Democratic member of the United States House of Representatives from New York. Born in Brooklyn, New York, he attended public schools in the borough. He served in the United States Navy from 1944 to 1946 and was an officer of the New York City Department of Correction from 1957 to 1974. During this period, he enrolled at New York University (1963) and Baruch College (1964-1966) but did not take a degree from either institution.

Zeferetti was a  member of the New York State Crime Control Planning Board from 1972 to 1974 and a representative to President's Conference on Correction in 1971. He served as the president of the Correction Officers' Benevolent Association from 1968 to 1974.

In 1974, he was elected from a district that included the Park Slope, Sunset Park and Bay Ridge sections of Brooklyn, succeeding longtime incumbent Hugh Carey following his ascendancy to the governorship of New York. His district was eliminated in redistricting in 1982, and the bulk of its territory was merged with the Staten Island-based district of freshman Republican Guy Molinari, who defeated him in the general election that year.

References

Sources

1927 births
2018 deaths
American prison officers
Baruch College alumni
New York University alumni
People from Brooklyn
United States Navy sailors
Democratic Party members of the United States House of Representatives from New York (state)
American trade union leaders
Leaders of organizations
New York City Department of Correction